Horwood is a surname. Notable people with the surname include:

Alec Horwood (1914–1944), British Army officer and Victoria Cross recipient
Bonnie Horwood (born 1987), English women's footballer
Charles Horwood (1839–1870), English cricketer
Edgar Lewis Horwood (1868–1957), Canadian architect
Evan Horwood (born 1986), English footballer
Harold Horwood (1923–2006), Canadian writer and politician
Joel Horwood, English playwright
John Horwood (1803–1821)
Martin Horwood (born 1962), British politician
Neil Horwood (born 1964), Scottish footballer
Owen Horwood (1916–1998), South African politician
Ray Horwood (1927–2009), Australian rules footballer
Richard Horwood (1757/8–1803), English surveyor and cartographer
Stanley Horwood (1877–1959), South African cricketer
William Horwood (disambiguation), multiple people

See also
Craig Revel Horwood (born 1965), Australian-British dancer, choreographer, theatre director and television personality